Turbonilla gracillima is a species of sea snail, a marine gastropod mollusk in the family Pyramidellidae, the pyrams and their allies.

Description
The milk-white shell is very slender and acute, milk-white. Its length measures 3 mm. The  whorls of the protoconch are prolonged, but partly lost. The eight whorls of the teleoconch are well rounded at first, and later flattened. They are moderately contracted at the periphery and slightly shouldered at the summit. They are marked by slender, almost vertical, axial ribs, of which 12 occur upon the first, 14 upon the second and third, 16 upon the fourth, 18 upon the fifth and penultimate turn. The intercostal spaces are as broad as the ribs, terminating suddenly at the periphery. They are  crossed by about fourteen equal and equally spaced spiral pits, which are equal to the spaces which separate them. The periphery and the base of the body whorl are well rounded, and smooth without sculpture. The aperture is rhomboidal. The posterior angle is obtuse. The outer lip is thin. The columella is slender, and somewhat twisted.

Distribution
The type specimen was found in the Pacific Ocean off Mazatlán, Baja California.

References

External links
 To World Register of Marine Species

gracillima
Gastropods described in 1857